List of parks and gardens in the German city of Hamburg.

Hamburg is one of Europe's greenest metropolises, with parks and gardens alone making up eight percent of the city's land area, in addition to even larger percentages for nature reserves and agricultural land areas. In 2011, the city was voted "European Green Capital", in 2013 Hamburg hosted the International Garden Show (IGS) on the island of  Wilhelmsburg.

Lists

Public parks 
List of public urban parks in Hamburg. The list does not include protected areas such as forests or nature reserves, nor Hamburg's many park-like cemeteries. 

Legend:     

Photo impressions of Hamburg parks:

Public gardens 
List of public gardens in Hamburg. In some cases, a strict distinction between park or garden may be difficult. 

Legend:     

Photo impressions of Hamburg gardens:

See also 

 List of nature parks in Germany 
 List of botanical gardens in Germany

Notes

References

External links 
  
   

 
 
 
Hamburg
Hamburg
Parks and gardens